Victoria is a genus of moths in the family Geometridae described by Warren in 1897. The species of this genus are found in Africa.

Species
Some species of this genus are:
Victoria albipicta Warren, 1897
Victoria altimontaria Herbulot, 1971
Victoria argopastea L. B. Prout, 1938
Victoria barlowi L. B. Prout, 1922
Victoria compsa L. B. Prout, 1932
Victoria fifensis Wiltshire, 1994
Victoria fuscithorax Warren, 1905
Victoria gordoni L. B. Prout, 1912
Victoria immunifica L. B. Prout, 1912
Victoria melanochlora Carcasson, 1962
Victoria perornata Warren, 1898
Victoria rhodoblemma L. B. Prout, 1938
Victoria sematoperas L. B. Prout, 1916
Victoria subhyalina Herbulot, 1982
Victoria taminata Herbulot, 1982
Victoria triplaga L. B. Prout, 1915
Victoria watsonae Carcasson, 1971
Victoria wiltshirei Hausmann, 1996

References

Geometrinae
Geometridae genera